Develothon is a developer skill marathon aimed at helping the software developer community in India develop skills in newer technology areas. The name Develothon is derived from combining 'developerWorks' and 'Marathon'.

Concept 

Develothon 2010 was a pan-India road show integrated with the IBM developerWorks forum and focused on topics covered under the Smarter Planet initiative. The program aimed to bring about active transformational learning through 40 Unconferences in 31 cities along with 40 technical briefings. Seventy five speakers delivered sessions chosen by the audience. In each city, the audience got a chance to vote speakers for the Top Speaker Trophy based on their presentation abstract and session delivery. It was conceived by Himanshu Goyal and his team including Kunal Dureja, Bharti Muthu, Prasanna Kumar, Apra Sahey, Dhirender Nirwani, Sarvanan Sekar, P Dasgupta, Anil Menon, Malathi Srinivasan, Pradeep Nair and many others at IBM.

In metro cities, the technical sessions with flexible agenda covered all of Smarter Planet themes, while in Tier 2 and Tier 3 smaller cities of India, the program offered technical briefing sessions on emerging technology topics such as Cloud Computing and Web 2.0. The sessions also focused on key IBM Software Group technologies such as Rational, Information Management, WebSphere, Lotus and Tivoli in accordance with IBM's Smarter Planet Theme of Dynamic Infrastructure, Smart Work, New Intelligence and Smarter Products based on local geographic needs.

Limca Book of Records 

Develothon has been awarded the Limca Book of Records award under Learning for delivering skill marathon covering 40 Live technical briefings in 31 cities. Skill Marathon happens in a relay format with each set of team members passing the baton on to another set of team members during the trip thus ensuring continuity across the complete 40 days of the journey.

IBM developerWorks 

Since 1999, IBM developerWorks has been a key destination for IT professionals as a comprehensive source for technical content, trial code, and forums. developerWorks continues to help software professionals stay ahead of the latest trends in open standards, develop new skills, solve problems, and work collaboratively with peers.

In addition to this, developerWorks offers an online community called My developerWorks, which was created to help users build relationships with technical professionals who have similar interests.

The Develothon Program was plugged into developerWorks to enable developers and academia to learn both online and offline.
Some of the online learning aids from developerWorks that were available in the Develothon program were product trials, technology eKits, downloadable or cloud based sandboxes, online briefings, free eBooks, training SkillKits, Java Development Kit (JDK) and online workshops.

Over 18,000 IT professionals were skilled in 2009 in India.

Develothon 2010 Itinerary 

The program started on 22 March in Mumbai and passed through various Metro, tier II and III cities. After covering a distance of over 4598 kilometers across 12 cities from 11 states and connecting more than 5000 people, Develothon 2010 finally ended its journey back in Mumbai on 30 April.

Webathon 2010 
Develothon continues its skill journey in a new online avatar called Webathon 2010. Spread across 10 days and delivered over the Internet, Webathon is a e-learning Skill Marathon providing daily virtual briefings on the 10 most vital software and emerging technology tracks. Webathon is on from Oct 19 - Nov 1 2010.

References

External links 
 Develothon 2010 Photographs
 Develothon 2010 YouTube Videos
 Develothon in Indore 
 Develothon in Ahmedabad 
 Develothon in Chennai 
 Develothon in Bangalore 
 Develothon in Goa 
 developerWorks 
 developerWorks India 
 Smarter Planet 
 Cloud Computing 
 Webathon 2010

IBM